The Rattle That Lock Tour was a concert tour by English singer and musician David Gilmour to support his fourth solo studio album, Rattle That Lock. The tour became a commercial success, grossing $47 million and selling 288,997 tickets in 16 shows in the 2015 total. It was the 76th highest grossing of the year, according to Pollstar's annual year end tour chart. The tour covered 50 performances – 17 more than his On an Island Tour in 2006. The tour is documented on the live release Live at Pompeii (2017).

Background
The first eight tour dates (in Europe) were announced on 4 March 2015, with two more dates added later. The concerts are spread across six European countries at nine different venues. The dates were planned to coincide with the release of Gilmour's new album. The two new dates were announced on 6 March 2015 at the Royal Albert Hall, and were added due to high ticket demand for the three concerts already planned at the venue. On 19 June 2015, a date was announced for a show in Wrocław, Poland, on 25 June 2016. Four North American dates were also announced on 16 July 2015, along with more details on the new album, to be released 18 September. Four more North American dates were added on 21 July 2015, in the same venues as the first four. On 26 July 2015, a 'preview show' was added at the Brighton Centre before the start of the main tour. Gilmour announced his first South American tour of five dates on 4 September 2015. Individual new dates were announced periodically until 2 February 2016, when a further 11 dates were added in Europe to take place in summer 2016.

Most of the venues on the first European leg of the tour were at Roman amphitheatres. Gilmour also played the Royal Albert Hall as his only UK venue of the tour. He also played the historic Auditorium Theatre in Chicago, having last performed there with Pink Floyd in 1972.

The touring band is made up of mostly the same musicians who accompanied Gilmour on his On an Island Tour of 2006. These are Phil Manzanera, Guy Pratt, Jon Carin and Steve DiStanislao. Kevin McAlea, who performed with Carin at Kate Bush's Before the Dawn shows in 2014, also played keyboards on the tour.

On 24 April 2016 Gilmour and his band played the final night of the year's Teenage Cancer Trust shows. This was Gilmour's first performance since the death of Prince three days earlier; as a tribute Gilmour worked a small portion of Prince's "Purple Rain" into "Comfortably Numb", immediately before the closing guitar solo; the stage lights all turned purple during the snippet. This brought the third leg of the tour to a close before new band members were drafted in.

When the third leg of the tour ended Gilmour's online outlets announced that Manzanera, Carin and McAlea would all be leaving the tour. Manzanera left due to obligations to recording a new solo album; Carin, to tour with Roger Waters in Mexico & Desert Trip. Shortly before the fourth leg Gilmour announced the new musicians for the European tour, they are Chester Kamen on guitar, whom Gilmour performed with as part of Bryan Ferry's band for Live Aid in 1985, replacing Manzanera; Greg Phillinganes on keyboards and vocals, replacing Carin; and Chuck Leavell on organ, vocals and accordion, long time member of The Rolling Stones' touring band and ex-member of The Allman Brothers Band, replacing McAlea. The new band rehearsed songs not performed previously on the tour, "Dancing Right In Front of Me" and "One of These Days". "One of These Days" hadn't been performed since the last Pink Floyd tour in 1994. Both songs were debuted on the tour during Gilmour's show at Wrocław, Poland where they replaced "Fat Old Sun" and "Astronomy Domine", respectively.

On 25 June 2016 Gilmour performed at Wrocław, Poland in celebration of the city being European Capital of Culture 2016. The show saw the live debut of the song "Dancing Right In Front of Me" and the resurrection of "One of These Days", last performed in 1994. The show was broadcast live on Polish television. Gilmour and his band were accompanied by the Wrocław Philharmonic Orchestra conducted by Zbigniew Preisner, who contributed orchestrations to Gilmour's Rattle That Lock and On An Island albums. The orchestra performed on the tracks "5 A.M."; "Rattle That Lock"; "Faces of Stone"; "A Boat Lies Waiting"; "The Blue"; "In Any Tongue" (with cello solo); "High Hopes"; "Dancing Right In Front of Me"; "On an Island"; "The Girl in The Yellow Dress"; "Today" and "Comfortably Numb".

On 7 and 8 July 2016 Gilmour performed two shows at the Pompeii amphitheatre where he performed with Pink Floyd in 1971, and filmed Pink Floyd: Live at Pompeii. The performance on the 7 July was the first performance in the amphitheatre since Pink Floyd played there and the first public performance there since AD 79, when Vesuvius erupted, destroying Pompeii. Gilmour's wife, Polly Samson regularly tweeted about the event using the hashtag #ReturnToPompeii. Gilmour performed "One of These Days" on both nights – the only song from the set to have been performed by Pink Floyd there in 1971. Gilmour also dropped "Us and Them" from the set and replaced it with "The Great Gig in the Sky" but played earlier in the set (see the setlist details below). The shows were filmed for possible future release. On 31 May 2017, it was announced that Gilmour's new film—David Gilmour Live At Pompeii—should hit select cinemas for one night only on 13 September 2017.

On 16 July, Gilmour performed at Château de Chantilly, in France.  He started the show by asking for a minute of silence to pay tribute to the victims of the terrorist attack that happened two days before in Nice.  He did the same for the shows at the Arena of Nîmes on 20 and 21 July.The 23 July he perform at Saline Royale d Arc et Senans.

Unlike the On an Island Tour of 2006 where Gilmour performed the whole of his then-new album in its entirety, the Rattle That Lock tour saw no performances of "Beauty" or "And Then..." and only saw two performances of "Dancing Right In Front of Me".

Setlists
Set lists for individual shows are available online.

Legs 1–3

Set One:
 "5 A.M."
 "Rattle That Lock"
 "Faces of Stone"
 "Wish You Were Here"
 "What Do You Want From Me" (added from 25 March 2016 onward)
 "A Boat Lies Waiting"
 "The Blue"
 "Money"
 "Us and Them"
 "In Any Tongue"
 "High Hopes"

Encore:
 "Time / Breathe (Reprise)"
 "Comfortably Numb" (On 24 April 2016 contained an excerpt of "Purple Rain" following the death of Prince.)

Set Two:
 "Astronomy Domine"
 "Shine On You Crazy Diamond (Parts I-II, IV-V)"
 "Fat Old Sun" 
 "Coming Back to Life" (performed from 15–19 September and 2 October, permanently added from 14 December)
 "On an Island" (dropped during 14–18 December 2015 and from 25 March – 6 April 2016 and 11–12 April)
 "The Girl In the Yellow Dress" (dropped on 10 April)
 "Today"
 "Sorrow"
 "Run Like Hell"

Legs 4–5
Shows during Leg 4 are one of the two following sets (A or B):

Set One, Set A:

 "5 A.M."
 "Rattle That Lock"
 "Faces of Stone"
 "What Do You Want From Me"
 "Wish You Were Here"
 "A Boat Lies Waiting"
 "The Blue"
 "Money"
 "Us and Them"
 "In Any Tongue"
 "High Hopes"

Set One, Set B: – Set B was introduced at the first Pompeii show on 7 July 2016.
 "5 A.M."
 "Rattle That Lock"
 "Faces of Stone"
 "What Do You Want From Me"
 "The Blue"
 "The Great Gig in the Sky"
 "A Boat Lies Waiting"
 "Wish You Were Here"
 "Money"
 "In Any Tongue"
 "High Hopes"

Set Two, Set A or B:
 "Astronomy Domine" (dropped between 3–10 July 2016; 14–28 July 2016 and 23–30 September 2016)"One of These Days" (replaced "Astronomy Domine" between 3–10 July 2016; 14–28 July 2016 and 23–30 September 2016)
 "Shine On You Crazy Diamond (Parts I-II, IV-V)"
 "Fat Old Sun" (dropped on 25 June 2016)"Dancing Right in Front of Me"  (replaced "Fat Old Sun" on 25 June 2016, played additionally 28 July 2016)
 "Coming Back to Life"
 "On an Island"
 "The Girl In the Yellow Dress" (dropped on 25, 28 & 29 September 2016)"Us and Them" (replaced "The Girl in the Yellow Dress" on 25, 28 & 29 September 2016)
 "Today"
 "Sorrow"
 "Run Like Hell"

Encore:
 "Time / Breathe (Reprise)"
 "Comfortably Numb"

The setlist for Set Two does not change between Sets A and B.

Tour band

Legs 1–3

Main band
David Gilmour – electric guitars, acoustic guitars, classical guitar, console steel guitar, lead vocals, whistling on "In Any Tongue"
Phil Manzanera – electric guitars, acoustic guitars, 12-string acoustic guitar, backing vocals
Guy Pratt – bass guitars, double bass, backing vocals, lead vocals on "Run Like Hell"
Jon Carin – piano, keyboards, electric guitars, lap steel guitars, backing vocals, lead vocals on "Time" and "Comfortably Numb"
Kevin McAlea – piano, keyboards, accordion
Steve DiStanislao – drums, percussion, backing vocals 
Theo Travis – saxophones, clarinet (5 September – 19 September)
João Mello – saxophones, additional keyboards on "The Blue", high-strung acoustic guitar on "In Any Tongue" (23 September onwards)
Bryan Chambers – backing vocals, additional percussion, lead vocals on "In Any Tongue"
Louise Clare Marshall – backing vocals, additional percussion (except South America)
Lucita Jules – backing vocals (South America and North America only)

Special guests
David Crosby – harmony vocals on "A Boat Lies Waiting" and "On an Island"; lead and backing vocals on "Comfortably Numb" (23 September, Royal Albert Hall)
Graham Nash – harmony vocals on "A Boat Lies Waiting" and "On an Island"; backing vocals on "Comfortably Numb" (23 September, Royal Albert Hall)
Gabriel Gilmour – piano on "In Any Tongue" (25 September, Royal Albert Hall)

Legs 4–5

Main band
David Gilmour – electric guitars, acoustic guitars, classical guitar, console steel guitar, lead vocals, cymbals on "One of These Days", whistling on "In Any Tongue"
Chester Kamen – electric guitars, acoustic guitars, 12-string acoustic guitar, backing vocals, harmonica on "The Blue"
Guy Pratt – bass guitars, double bass, backing vocals, lead vocals on "Run Like Hell"
Greg Phillinganes – keyboards, backing vocals, lead vocals on "Time" 
Chuck Leavell – keyboards, accordion, backing vocals, lead vocals on "Comfortably Numb" (Leg 4 only)
Kevin McAlea – keyboards, accordion (Leg 5 only)
Steve DiStanislao – drums, percussion, backing vocals, aeoliphone on "One of These Days"
João Mello – saxophones, clarinet, additional keyboards on "The Blue", high-strung acoustic guitar on "In Any Tongue"
Bryan Chambers – backing vocals, additional percussion, lead vocals on "The Great Gig in the Sky", "In Any Tongue" and "Comfortably Numb" (Leg 5)
Lucita Jules – backing vocals, lead vocals on "The Great Gig in the Sky" and "Comfortably Numb" (Leg 5)
Louise Clare Marshall – backing vocals, additional percussion, lead vocals on "The Great Gig in the Sky" and "Comfortably Numb" (Leg 5) (certain dates)

Special guests
Leszek Możdżer – piano on "The Girl in the Yellow Dress" (Wrocław, 25 June 2016)
Wrocław Philharmonic Orchestra conducted by Zbigniew Preisner (Wrocław, 25 June 2016)
Benedict Cumberbatch – lead vocals on "Comfortably Numb" (London, 28 September 2016)

Tour dates

Notes

References

External links 

David Gilmour
2015 concert tours
2016 concert tours